Marginella huberti is a species of colorful small sea snail, a marine gastropod mollusc in the family Marginellidae.

Distribution
This species occurs in Angola, south central Africa.

Shell description 
The shell is 17 to 27 mm in length, 10 to 16 mm in greatest diameter, with a low conical spire and an indistinct suture. The outer lip is thickened, and strongly reflected outward, with a sharp edge overhanging the exterior of the body whorl.

The inside of the lip of the shell has 15-25 small irregular denticles, plus one very strong isolated denticle near its posterior end. The aperture is quite high for the genus, and it narrows both anteriorly and posteriorly.

The first two apical whorls are pale brown. The remainder of the shell is beige with tiny ash-grey dots arranged in spiral rows and looser wavy axial lines. There are small dark blotches serially arranged along the suture, and a larger series of crescentic blotches just above the shoulder of the body whorl. The areas between the shoulder and the suture, and along a band on the anterior part of the body whorl, are darker with blurred blotches; some darker blotches or flames are also sometimes visible on the middle part of the body whorl. The outer lip has 15 to 25 dark grey streaks, often clustered in groups of 2 or 3, and mostly visible on the outermost, reflected part of the lip.

Type material

Type locality 
Baía dos Elefantes, Benguela, in 15 fathoms (27m).

Habitat 
In shell gravel or mixed sediments around rocky areas, at 10 to 100m.

Color and patterns

References 

 BMNH British Museum (Natural History), London
 Clover, Philip 1972. Two new species of Marginellidae from West Africa. Journal of Conchology 27:503-04, pl. XIX
 Gofas, Serge and Francisco Fernandes 1994. The Marginellidae of Angola: The genus Marginella. Journal of Conchology 35:103-119

Endemic fauna of Angola
Marginellidae
Gastropods described in 1972